The Idara-e-Aman-o Insaf (Committee for Peace and Justice) was set up in 1974 by the Roman Catholic Archdiocese of Karachi and the Church of Pakistan in Karachi. The organisation served the people irrespective of tribe, clan, colour or creed.

For the past 30 years, the Committee for Justice and Peace, has worked for poor and marginalised Christians and Muslims, labouring to obtain for them basic employment rights. It has also assisted women, provided information on issues such as the discriminatory Blasphemy Laws, and undertaken programmes with local human rights groups.

The Idare-e Amn-O-Insaf is an NGO. It's Pakistan-based and run by Pakistani Christians. The charity deals with social and labor issues, while it also publishes a magazine called Jafakash (Hard Worker). A recent issue dealt with Pakistan's controversial blasphemy laws. Tauqir Chughtai, a political and social commentator, was editor of the monthly Jafakash magazine from 1990 to 2002. For a while journalist Rahim Bakhsh Azad was also editor of Jafakash.

On 25 September 2002, the brutal murders of seven Christians at the Idare-e Amn-O-Insaf office in Karachi, shocked the world. These vicious, premeditated murders were the latest in a series of acts of violence targeting the Christian minority community in Pakistan. In recent months, Pakistani Christians have suffered from the mass murder of 16 (and a Muslim policeman) in Bahawalpur (28 October 2001), five in Islamabad (16 March 2002), six in Murree Christian School (5 August 2002) and four in Mission Hospital Taxila (9 August 2002).

On September 25, 2003, the two Church sponsors of the Idara marked the first anniversary of the killing of the seven Idara workers. A Mass was celebrated at St. Patrick´s Cathedral followed by a meeting of family members of the victims with Church officials and police. Idara administrator Zafar Iqbal said that the bishops are to meet soon to finalize the resumption of activities by the committee and it was hoped that 'ts office could be open again in a few months.

There are two similar organizations for Social Action in Pakistan: the Human Development Center Toba Tek Singh and the Justice & Peace Commission - Multan. There is also a National Commission for Justice and Peace of the Catholic Church in Pakistan. In 2009, Peter Jacob was the executive secretary of the NCJP and Archbishop Lawrence Saldanha was the chairperson of the Commission.

After the carnage in 2002 the Idara was not able to recover and never re-opened. However, a branch of the Idara-e-Amn-o-Insaf was reported to be functioning in Lahore in 2012.

References

Christian organisations based in Pakistan
Church of Pakistan
Catholic Church in Pakistan
1974 establishments in Pakistan
Organisations based in Karachi
Christian organizations established in 1974
Non-profit organisations based in Pakistan